Chae-yeon also spelled Chae-yun or Chae-yon is a Korean feminine given name. The meaning differs based on the hanja used to write each syllable of the name. There are 17 hanja with the reading "chae"
and 56 hanja with the reading "yeon" on the South Korean government's official list of hanja which may be registered for use in given names.

People
People with this name include:

 Kim Chae-yeon (actress) (born 1977), South Korean actress
 Lee Chae-yeon (singer, born 1978), South Korean singer
 Suhr Chae-yeon (born 1996), South Korean figure skater
 Jung Chae-yeon (born 1997), South Korean singer, former member of DIA and I.O.I
 Lee Chae-yeon (born 2000), South Korean singer, former member of Iz*One
 Kim Chae-yeon (born 2004), South Korean singer and actress, member of TripleS
 Kim Chae-yeon (born 2006), South Korean figure skater

Fictional characters
Fictional characters with this name include:
 Gyo Chae-yeon from 2014 TV series Birth of a Beauty

See also
List of Korean given names

References

Korean feminine given names